Robert 'Bob' Henry Pomphrey (born 6 October 1944) is a former English cricketer. Pomphrey was a right-handed batsman. He was born at Warminster, Wiltshire.

Pomphrey made his debut for Hertfordshire in the 1971 Minor Counties Championship against Buckinghamshire. Pomphrey played Minor counties cricket for Hertfordshire from 1971 to 1985, which included 90 Minor Counties Championship matches. He made his List A debut against Durham in the 1974 Gillette Cup. He made 5 further List A appearances for the county, the last coming against Essex in the 1981 NatWest Trophy. In his 6 List A matches, he scored 54 runs at an average of 9.00, with a high score of 22. He also played a single List A match for Minor Counties South against Somerset in the 1979 Benson & Hedges Cup. In his only match for the team, he was dismissed for 2 by Vic Marks.

References

External links
Bob Pomphrey at ESPNcricinfo

1944 births
Living people
People from Warminster
English cricketers
Hertfordshire cricketers
Minor Counties cricketers